Tarja Kaarina Halonen (born 24 December 1943) is a Finnish politician who served as the 11th president of Finland, and the first woman to hold the position, from 2000 to 2012. She first rose to prominence as a lawyer with the Central Organisation of Finnish Trade Unions (SAK), and as the Prime Minister's parliamentary secretary (1974–1975) and a member of the City Council of Helsinki (1977–1996). Halonen was a Social Democratic Party member of parliament from 1979 until her election to the presidency in 2000. She also served as a minister at the Ministry of Social Affairs and Health from 1987 to 1990, as Minister of Justice from 1990 to 1991, and as Minister for Foreign Affairs from 1995 to 2000.

Halonen was an extremely popular president, with her approval ratings reaching a peak of 88 percent in December 2003. She was re-elected in 2006, defeating National Coalition Party candidate Sauli Niinistö in the second round by 51% to 48%. Ineligible to run in the 2012 presidential elections because of term limits, Halonen left office on 1 March 2012 and was succeeded by Niinistö.

Widely known for her interest in human rights issues, Halonen served as the chairperson of the Finnish LGBT rights organization Seta in the 1980s, and she actively participated in the discussion of issues such as women's rights and the problems of globalization during her presidency. In 2006, she was mentioned by various commentators as a potential candidate for the United Nations Secretary-General selection, but she denied an interest at that time, stating that she wanted to finish her term as president before thinking about other career options.<ref>

Honours

National honours
 Finland: Former Grand Master Grand Cross of the Order of the Cross of Liberty
 Finland: Former Grand Master Grand Cross with Collar of the Order of the White Rose 
 Finland: Former Grand Master Grand Cross of the Order of the Lion

Foreign honours
 Austria: Grand Star of the Order of Honour for Services to the Republic of Austria
 Belgium: Knight Grand Cordon of the Order of Leopold I
 Brazil: Grand Cross with Collar of the Order of the Southern Cross
 Chile: Grand Cross with Collar of the Order of Merit
 Croatia: Grand Cross of the Order of King Tomislav
 Denmark: Knight of the Order of the Elephant
 Denmark: Knight Grand Cross of the Order of Dannebrog
 Estonia: Collar of the Order of the Cross of Terra Mariana
 Estonia: Collar of the Order of the White Star
 France: Grand Cross of the Order of the Legion of Honour
 Germany: Grand Cross of the Order of Merit of the Federal Republic of Germany, Special Class
 Greece: Grand Cross of the Order of the Redeemer
 Greece: Grand Cross of the Order of Honour
 Iceland: Grand Cross with Collar of the Order of the Falcon
 Italy: Grand Cross with Collar of the Order of Merit of the Italian Republic
 Japan: Knight Grand Cordon with Collar of the Order of the Chrysanthemum
 Kazakhstan: Grand Collar of the Order of the Golden Eagle
 Latvia: Commander Grand Cross with Chain of the Order of the Three Stars
 Liberia: Grand Cross of the Order of the Pioneers of Liberia
 Lithuania: Grand Cross with Chain of the Order of Vytautas the Great
 Luxembourg: Knight of the Order of the Gold Lion of the House of Nassau
 Netherlands: Knight Grand Cross of the Order of the House of Orange
 Norway: Knight Grand Cross with Collar of the Order of St. Olav
 Qatar: Knight Grand Cross with Collar of the  Order of Merit
 Poland: Grand Cross of the Order of the White Eagle
 Portugal: Grand Cross with Collar of the Order of Prince Henry
 Romania: Grand Cross with Collar of the Order of the Star of Romania
 Russia: Recipient of the Medal of Pushkin
 Saudi Arabia: Grand Cross of the Order of Abdulaziz al Saud
 Senegal: Grand Cross of the Order of the Lion
 Slovakia: Grand Cross of the Order of the White Double Cross
 Slovenia: Member of the Decoration for Exceptional Merits
 Spain: Knight Grand Cross with Collar of the Order of Isabella the Catholic
 Sweden: Member with Collar of the Royal Order of the Seraphim
 Sweden: Commander Grand Cross of the Royal Order of the Polar Star

Awards
 Canada: 2014 Fray International Sustainability Award given by FLOGEN Star Outreach 
 University of Helsinki, Faculty of Philosophy, 2010
 Kazan (Volga region) Federal University, 2010
 Theatre Academy Helsinki, 2009
 Umeå University, Sweden, 2009
 University of Minnesota Duluth, 2008
 Helsinki University of Technology, 2008
 Yerevan State University, 2005
 University of Tartu, 2004
 University of Bluefields, 2004
 University of Turku, 2003
 Finlandia University, 2003
 Chinese Academy of Forestry, 2002
 Eötvös Loránd University, 2002
 University of Kent, 2002
 Ewha Womans University, 2002
 Helsinki School of Economics, 2001
 University of Helsinki, Faculty of Law, 2000

In popular culture 
A long-running joke, which stems from the recurring segment "Conan O'Brien Hates My Homeland", is that American talk show host Conan O'Brien resembles Tarja Halonen. After joking about this for several months (which led to his endorsement of her campaign), O'Brien travelled to Finland, appeared on several television shows and met President Halonen. The trip was filmed and aired as a special.

Halonen also appears as an animated character in the political satire TV series The Autocrats.

See also
 List of national leaders
 Club of Rome

References

Notes

External links

 Halonen, Tarja Kaarina
 Tarja Halonen & Seta
 Social-democratic party of Finland
 Tarja Halonen in The Presidents of Finland

|-

|-

|-

 
1943 births
Living people
Politicians from Helsinki
Social Democratic Party of Finland politicians
Presidents of Finland
Ministers of Justice of Finland
Ministers for Foreign Affairs of Finland
Members of the Parliament of Finland (1979–83)
Members of the Parliament of Finland (1983–87)
Members of the Parliament of Finland (1987–91)
Members of the Parliament of Finland (1991–95)
Members of the Parliament of Finland (1995–99)
Members of the Parliament of Finland (1999–2003)
21st-century Finnish women politicians
Female foreign ministers
20th-century Finnish lawyers
Finnish Lutherans
Finnish women lawyers
LGBT and Lutheranism
Finnish LGBT rights activists
Women government ministers of Finland
Women presidents
University of Helsinki alumni

Collars of the Order of Isabella the Catholic
Commanders Grand Cross of the Order of the Lion of Finland
Commanders Grand Cross of the Order of the Polar Star
First Class of the Order of the Star of Romania
Grand Collars of the Order of Prince Henry
Grand Croix of the Légion d'honneur
Grand Crosses of the Order of Honour (Greece)
Grand Crosses of the Order of Prince Henry
Grand Crosses of the Order of the Cross of Liberty
Grand Crosses of the Order of the Dannebrog
Grand Crosses of the Order of the House of Orange
Grand Crosses of the Order of the Star of Romania
Grand Crosses Special Class of the Order of Merit of the Federal Republic of Germany
Grand Crosses with Golden Chain of the Order of Vytautas the Great
Knights Grand Cross of the Order of Isabella the Catholic
Knights Grand Cross of the Order of the Falcon
Knights Grand Cross with Collar of the Order of Merit of the Italian Republic
Recipients of the Collar of the Order of the Cross of Terra Mariana
Recipients of the Decoration for Services to the Republic of Austria
Recipients of the Grand Star of the Decoration for Services to the Republic of Austria
Recipients of the Medal of Pushkin
Recipients of the Order of Isabella the Catholic
Recipients of the Order of Merit of the Italian Republic
Recipients of the Order of Prince Henry
Recipients of the Order of the House of Orange
Recipients of the Order of the Lion of Finland
Recipients of the Order of the Falcon
Recipients of the Order of Vytautas the Great
Female justice ministers
Women members of the Parliament of Finland
Finnish women diplomats
Candidates for President of Finland
Recipients of the Order of the White Star, 1st Class
Recipients of the Order of the White Eagle (Poland)
Female heads of state
Recipients of the Order of Prince Yaroslav the Wise, 1st class
Finnish women activists